A 3D printed firearm is a firearm that is primarily produced with a 3D printer. They can be classified by the type of 3D printers used: plastic (desktop fused filament fabrication), metal (industrial selective laser melting), or both. While plastic ones are usually used as improvised firearms that evade gun control, 3D-printed metal guns are more commonly thought as a way for legitimate gun manufacturers to exceed traditional design limitations.

Although it is possible to create fully-plastic guns, such firearms tend to be extremely short-lived. Instead, it is more practical to print a plastic frame and use metal in the action and the barrel. The metal parts can be self-made or bought in the form of a parts kit.

A related issue is the production of 3D-printed parts for conventional firearms. Printed high-capacity magazines circumvent limits on assault weapons, sears weaken the control on fully automatic firearms, and pistol braces challenge the limit on short-barreled rifles.

History 

In 2012, the U.S.-based team Defense Distributed disclosed plans to design a working plastic gun that could be downloaded and reproduced by anybody with a 3D printer. Defense Distributed has also designed a 3D printable AR-15 type rifle lower receiver (capable of lasting more than 650 rounds) and a variety of magazines. In May 2013, Defense Distributed completed design of the first working blueprint to produce a plastic gun with a 3D printer. The United States Department of State demanded removal of the instructions from the Defense Distributed (DEFCAD) website, deeming them a violation of the Arms Export Control Act. In 2015, Defense Distributed founder Cody Wilson sued the United States government on free speech grounds and in 2018 the Department of Justice settled, acknowledging Wilson's right to publish instructions for the production of 3D printed firearms.

The legal actions against Defense Distributed has inspired the creation of more decentralized 3D-printed firearm communities, including Deterrence Dispensed and FOSSCAD, in 2019. Participants of these internet-based communities remain anonymous, and are sometimes based in jurisdictions that ban custom gun production.

In 2013 a Texas company, Solid Concepts, demonstrated a 3D printed version of an M1911 pistol made of metal, using an industrial 3D printer. In 2014, a New Zealand company, Oceania Defence, demonstrated 3D printed titanium suppressors that are 50% lighter than conventional ones.

The Grizzly is a 3D printed .22-caliber rifle created around August 2013. It was created using a Stratasys Dimension 1200es printer. It was created by a Canadian only known by the pseudonym "Matthew" who told The Verge that he was in his late 20s, and his main job was making tools for the construction industry. The original Grizzly fired a single shot before breaking. Grizzly 2.0 fired fourteen bullets before getting damaged due to the strain.

In October 2020, another 3D-printed 9mm rifle known as the "FGC-9" was created. It is reported that it can be made in 2 weeks with $500 of tools. A second model was later made in April 2021.

Effect on gun control 
After Defense Distributed released their plans, questions were raised regarding the effects that 3D printing and widespread consumer-level CNC machining may have on gun control effectiveness.

The U.S. Department of Homeland Security and the Joint Regional Intelligence Center released a memo stating "Significant advances in three-dimensional (3D) printing capabilities, availability of free digital 3D printer files for firearms components, and difficulty regulating file sharing may present public safety risks from unqualified gun seekers who obtain or manufacture 3D printed guns," and that "proposed legislation to ban 3D printing of weapons may deter, but cannot completely prevent their production. Even if the practice is prohibited by new legislation, online distribution of these digital files will be as difficult to control as any other illegally traded music, movie or software files."

Internationally, where gun controls are generally tighter than in the United States, some commentators have said the impact may be more strongly felt, as alternative firearms are not as easily obtainable. European officials have noted that producing a 3D printed gun would be illegal under their gun control laws, and that criminals have access to other sources of weapons, but noted that as the technology improved the risks of an effect would increase. Downloads of the plans from the UK, Germany, Spain, and Brazil were heavy.

Attempting to restrict the distribution over the Internet of gun plans has been likened to the futility of preventing the widespread distribution of DeCSS which enabled DVD ripping. After the US government had Defense Distributed take down the plans, they were still widely available via The Pirate Bay and other file sharing sites. Some US legislators have proposed regulations on 3D printers to prevent their use for printing guns. 3D printing advocates have suggested that such regulations would be futile, could cripple the 3D printing industry, and could infringe on free speech rights.

3D printing pioneer Professor Hod Lipson suggested that gunpowder could be controlled instead.

Chelsea Parsons at the Center for American Progress advocated technical countermeasures designed to prevent owners from printing guns. The EURion constellation is used in a similar way to prevent color photocopiers from producing counterfeit currency, and the Counterfeit Deterrence System is used in image editing software.

Legal status

Australia 
In Australia, the state law of New South Wales criminalizes the possession of the digital plans and files to 3D print firearms under Section 51F of the Firearms Act 1996. In one case in 2015, a loaded 3D printed firearm was found during a police raid on a meth lab.

In another case in February 2017, Sicen Sun was arrested on charges related to 3D printable guns. During trial in December 2017, he pleaded guilty to charges including possessing a digital blueprint for the manufacture of firearms, manufacturing a pistol without a licence permit, and possessing an unauthorised pistol. In a sentence hearing on August 6, 2018, he told the court he initially wanted to replicate a gun from the videogame Halo and when he started searching blueprints online he downloaded plans for other guns which looked "cool." Sun had previously posted an advertisement to the internet to sell one of his imitation weapons for "$1 million negotiable" on a Facebook buy, swap and sell group, which set off the investigation.

Canada 

The Canadian Criminal Code makes it a crime for a person to manufacture (or offer to manufacture) any firearm or ammunition knowing that the person is not authorized to do so under Canadian laws or regulations. Authorizations to manufacture can be obtained, for example, as a capability attached to a firearms business license. The Canadian government moreover has stated that "regardless of manufacturing method, a business licence is required to produce a firearm". At least two separate cases during 2020 have led to charges for 3D printing of firearms.

Germany  
The Halle synagogue shooting gained particular notoriety for the use of improvised firearms by the perpetrator. One of the firearms he brought along (though did not use) was a hybrid  design where the lower receiver was 3D printed, and he also had 3D printed magazines. He also had manufactured several more 3D printed guns that were not brought along. This sparked questions over the legal status of such firearms, though the consensus in most parties represented in the Bundestag was that no additional legislation would be necessary, as the current German gun law explicitly prohibits the unlicensed manufacture of firearms regardless of method.

Italy 
3D-printed firearms in Italy are subjected to the same laws as typical gunsmithed firearms, only requiring a license, as long as the firearms stay within legal limits. In November 2021, it was reported that in Naples and other areas of Campania, the local Camorra has begun using 3D-printed firearms and ammunition due to ease of access and for selling on to other gangs. This was found out via the discovery of videos and images on a seized IPhone of said firearms.

Japan 
In Japan, in May 2014, Yoshitomo Imura was the first person to be arrested for possessing printed guns. Imura had five guns, two of which were capable of being fired, but had no ammunition. Imura had previously posted blueprints and video of his Zig zag revolvers to the Internet, which set off the investigation.

Singapore
The Singaporean government passed a law in January 2021 that made it an offence for anyone in Singapore to possess a digital blueprint of a gun or gun part without a license under the Guns, Explosives and Weapons Control Act.

United Kingdom 
In the United Kingdom, the Firearms Act 1968 bans the manufacturing of guns and gun parts without government approval. Hence, 3D printed weapons are de facto banned because the law bans all manufacturing, regardless of method. However, the Home Office updated its Guide on Firearms Licensing Law to specifically mention the ban on 3D printed weapons. 

In June 2019, Tendai Muswere, aged 26, became the first person in the United Kingdom charged with making a gun with a 3D printer. The firearm in question, which he claims was merely a movie-prop for a dystopian film he was working on, was found during a raid following claims he was growing and selling cannabis. Originally in October 2017, he claimed he was only printing gun-like models, however in February 2018, following another raid, it was found his intentions were to make a working firearm based on his browser history and some working gun components found in his house along with homemade gunpowder.

United States 

Under the Undetectable Firearms Act any firearm that cannot be detected by a metal detector is illegal to manufacture, so legal designs for firearms such as the Liberator require a metal plate to be inserted into the printed body. The Act was renewed for five years in 1998, and ten years in 2003 and 2013. The subject of 3D printed guns gained such attention that in 2014, Netflix included it in its documentary "Print the Legend", a film about the significance of 3D printing technology.

The company Defense Distributed, founded by Cody Wilson, started posting 3D-printed gun blueprints on the Internet in 2013. The Obama Administration decided to amend International Traffic in Arms Regulations to include 3D-printed firearms in 2015. With these changes in place, the United States Department of State Directorate of Defense Trade Controls ordered Defense Distributed to remove the plans since it was not licensed to export them. Various federal courts ruled in Defense Distributed v. United States Department of State which claimed the regulations violated the First and Second Amendments to the United States Constitution. The State Department settled the case by giving an export license to Defense Distributed, prevailing despite lawsuits from several states to prevent it.

In January 2020, the Trump Administration published a rule change to remove 3D-printed gun blueprints from the munitions list and transfer administrative authority over them to the Commerce Department. A U.S. District judge blocked the rule change on procedural grounds in March 2020, but the Ninth Circuit Court of Appeals overturned that ruling in April 2021. As a result, online posting of plans for 3D-printed firearms now requires a license under the Export Administration Regulations issued by the Bureau of Industry and Security.

Laws related to the manufacture, sale, and possession of firearms generally apply to 3D-printed firearms. Some state and local laws apply more specifically to 3D-printed guns:
 California requires (under a 2018 law) homemade guns to have a small piece of stainless steel embedded, with a serial number issued by the California Justice Department, and regulations with regard to safety classes and background checks apply.
 Massachusetts bans "concealed" weapons which cannot be found with metal detectors or which resemble other objects.
 New Jersey restricts manufacturing of 3D-printed guns and distributions for blueprints to licensed firearm manufacturers. In 2018, New Jersey Attorney General Gurbir Grewal sent a cease and desist letter to Defense Distributed ordering it not to distribute its plans to people in New Jersey.  The company sued on First Amendment grounds; as of March 2021, the case Defense Distributed v. Gurbir Grewal had been remanded to a district court after higher courts settled jurisdictional issues.
 Philadelphia banned the manufacture and possession of 3D-printed firearms in November 2013.

Currently, it is not federally prohibited by law to manufacture firearms for personal use in the United States, as long as the firearm is not produced with the intent to be sold or transferred, and meets a few basic requirements. A license is required to manufacture firearms for sale or distribution. The law prohibits a person from assembling a non–sporting semiautomatic rifle or shotgun from 10 or more imported parts, as well as firearms that cannot be detected by metal detectors or x–ray machines. In addition, the making of an NFA firearm requires a tax payment and advance approval by ATF.

See also 
 3D printing
 Gun control
 Gun politics in the United States
 Improvised firearm
 List of 3D printed weapons and parts

References

External links 
 Official FOSSCAD Library Repository
 How 3-D Printed Guns Evolved Into Serious Weapons in Just One Year, Wired, May 2014.
 Should We Be Afraid of the 3D Printed Gun?, Popular Mechanics, May 2014.